Cherry Run is a 4.4 mile (7.1 km) long stream that begins on the divide between Oil Creek and Pithole Creek in Venango County, Pennsylvania.

References

Additional Maps

Rivers of Venango County, Pennsylvania
Rivers of Pennsylvania
Tributaries of the Allegheny River